Egenera, Inc. is a multinational cloud manager and data center infrastructure automation company with corporate headquarters in Boxborough, Massachusetts in the United States. It is a privately held company with approximately 110 employees. Founded in March 2000, the company was named by Network World as one of the top 10 startups to watch in 2002 and was a winner in the annual "Red Herring 100 North America" award given by Red Herring magazine in 2006.

Egenera maintains overseas headquarters in the United Kingdom, Japan and Hong Kong.

History 

Egenera was founded by Vern Brownell in March 2000. 

The company launched its first product, the Egenera BladeFrame, in October, 2001.

In October 2006, Egenera announced its plan to create a separate line of business in order to make its virtualization management software, called PAN Manager, available under OEM agreement to other server vendors.

In December 2012, Egenera acquired Fort Technologies  who was a developer of cloud management software.

OEM partners 

As of 2013, Egenera has OEM agreements with the following vendors:
 Dell
 Fujitsu  
 Hewlett Packard
 IBM
 NEC

See also 
 Cloud computing
 Storage virtualization
 Network virtualization
 x86 virtualization
 Blade Server
 Fabric computing
 Unified computing

References 

Software companies based in Massachusetts
Virtualization software
Software companies established in 2000
Software companies of the United States
Remote companies